Badri Kvaratskhelia (born 15 February 1965) is a former footballer. Born in the Georgian SSR, he represented the Azerbaijan national team internationally.

Playing career
In early 1990s, Kvaratskhelia spent three seasons at this hometown team Skuri in the second tier of the Georgian football league before he joined reigning champions Dinamo Tbilisi for one year. In 1997, he moved to Azerbaijan club Kapaz Ganja, who claimed both the league title and the national cup that season. 

The next year Kvaratskhelia signed for Shamkir and became the league top scorer in the 1999-2000 season. In most memorable moment at Shamkir he scored a hat-trick in a Champions Cup qualifier against Skonto Riga on 19 July 2000.     
 
In 2000, he received an Azerbaijani citizenship and made a debut in a 0–0 draw against Georgian team. Later he played two more international matches.

Kvaratskhelia ended his playing career in 2004 and returned to Georgia.

Coaching career
After completing coaching courses Kvaratskhelia initially worked as assistant manager at Sioni Bolnisi, who won the league title in 2006. In early 2009, he took over the managerial position at now-defunct Azerbaijani side FK Standard Sumgayit. 

On 22 September 2015, Kvaratskhelia was appointed as the manager of Guria Lanchkhuti. It didn't last for long, because on 6 October 2015, he was then appointed as the manager of FC Merani Martvili.

In April 2018, Kvaratskhelia became the manager of FC Samtredia. He resigned at the end of the season. From February until 22 April 2019, he was the manager of FC Rustavi.

Shortly, due to a heart surgery Kvaratskhelia had to prematurely retire.

Statistics

Personal life
Badri is the father of Georgia national team player Khvicha Kvaratskhelia.

Honours
In Georgia
 Champion: 1992/93
In Azerbaijan
 Champion: 1997/98, 1999/00, 2000/01, 2001/02
 Runner-up: 1998/99, 2003/04
 Cup winner: 1997/98; 
 Cup runner-up: 1998/99, 2001/02, 2003/04
Individual
Azerbaijan Premier League top scorer: 1999/2000

References

External links

1965 births
Living people
People from Samegrelo-Zemo Svaneti
Mingrelians
Soviet footballers
Footballers from Georgia (country)
Azerbaijani footballers
Azerbaijan international footballers
Association football forwards
FK Standard Sumgayit managers
Naturalized citizens of Azerbaijan
Azerbaijani people of Mingrelian descent
Azerbaijani people of Georgian descent
Azerbaijani football managers